Izhevsk railway station is a railway station in the capital of Udmurtia — Izhevsk in Russia.

Main information
It includes the main building (built in 1952–1954), suburban terminal (built in 1971 and renovated in 2009) and a number of service buildings.

Trains
This is a list of trains that pass the station:

 Moscow — Izhevsk
 Yekaterinburg — Izhevsk
 Nizhny Novgorod — Izhevsk
 St.Petersburg — Izhevsk
 Adler — Perm
 Novorossiysk — Perm
 Kirov — Kazan
 Novorossiysk — Izhevsk
 Adler — Izhevsk
 Anapa — Izhevsk

Gallery

References

External links

Railway stations in Udmurtia
Railway stations in Russia opened in 1919
Izhevsk
Gorky Railway